Orfey (Russian: Орфей) was the lead ship of her class of eight her class of eight destroyers built for the Russian Imperial Navy during World War I. Completed in 1916, she served with the Baltic Fleet, but suffered turbine damage in late 1917, and was laid up for the rest of the war. The ship was not repaired by the Soviets and was scrapped in 1931.

Bibliography 

 

Orfey-class destroyers
Destroyers of the Imperial Russian Navy
Ships built in Russia
1916 ships
World War I destroyers of Russia